Hills End is the debut album by Australian indie rock band DMA's, released on 26 February 2016. It peaked at number eight for one week in March 2016 on the ARIA Albums Chart. The album also charted in the United Kingdom and the Netherlands. The album has received BRIT Certified Breakthrough status.

Track listing

Personnel
Credits adapted from the album's liner notes.

DMA's
Thomas O'Dell - vocals, drums on "Blown Away" and "Play It Out"
Matthew Mason - guitars, vocals, keys
Johnny Took - guitars, bass on "Blown Away"

Additional musicians
Paddy Harrowsmith - guitars
Liam Hoskins - drums
Thomas Crandles - bass (except "Delete" and "Lay Down")
Paddy Cornwall - bass on "Delete" and "Lay Down"

Charts

Certifications

References

2016 debut albums
DMA's albums
Infectious Music albums